The number of Canadian Forces' fatalities resulting from Canadian military activities in Afghanistan is the largest for any single Canadian military mission since the Korean War between 1950 and 1953. A total of 159 Canadian Forces personnel have been killed in the war since 2002.

Specifics

The first casualties occurred in the Tarnak Farm incident, in which four Canadians were killed and eight seriously wounded when a United States warplane dropped a bomb on a training exercise in the belief that the Canadians were enemy soldiers. The four servicemen were honoured at an event unprecedented in Canada in 2002.  The Skyreach Centre in Edmonton, Alberta, was filled to capacity for a tribute ceremony for the four deceased soldiers that included personal messages from Governor General Adrienne Clarkson, Prime Minister Jean Chretien, the Chief of Defence Staff, Premier of Alberta and Premier of Manitoba, and the Mayor of Edmonton, most of whom attended the service. Subsequently, deceased soldiers have been honoured by much smaller services.  

On 9 April 2007, Queen Elizabeth II made reference to all the deceased Canadians in Afghanistan when she rededicated the Vimy Memorial "to their eternal remembrance, to Canada, to all who would serve the cause of freedom, and to those who have lost their lives in Afghanistan." 

Further, in honour of all those who died during the Afghan mission, the section of Ontario's Highway 401 along which deceased soldiers are carried from Canadian Forces Base Trenton to Toronto after repatriation was named the Highway of Heroes. 

All those Canadian Forces personnel who are killed during the mission are posthumously awarded the Sacrifice Medal and their spouse or next of kin receive the Memorial Cross.

The first deployed Canadian woman combatant to die in combat was Captain Nichola Goddard.

The first soldier from Quebec to die in the mission in Afghanistan was Cpl Simon Longtin who died of his wounds resulting from an IED blast.

The death of Anthony Boneca initiated debate about the combat readiness of Canadian reservists, wherein questions were asked not only about the suitability of employing reservists, but also the role of the media in reporting comments by grief-stricken relatives, such as those made by Boneca's partner's father. The suitability of the Iltis vehicle was also questioned heavily following a land mine incident on 2 Oct 2003 that claimed the lives of two Canadian soldiers, Cpl Robbie Beerenfenger and Sgt Robert Short, leading the military to thereafter acquire Mercedes-Benz G-Class and RG-31 Nyala armoured patrol vehicles.

The first Canadian woman to die of suicide on an overseas deployment was Major Michelle Mendes, an intelligence officer, who died from self-inflicted gunshot wounds at Kandahar Airfield on 24 Apr 2009 only a few days after her arrival.

The first gravely injured Canadian soldier to redeploy in Kandahar was Captain Simon Mailloux in November 2009. Capt Mailloux had been gravely injured in November 2007 following an IED incident in the Panjwayi district and his left leg had to be amputated. Two more Canadian soldiers, Corporal Nicholas Beauchamp and Private Michel Levesque, died in the same incident. 

The highest ranking casualty was sustained on 18 May 2010, when Colonel Geoff Parker was killed after a suicide bomber drove a car full of explosives into a NATO convoy during morning rush hour on the edge of Kabul. Five U.S. soldiers and 12 Afghan civilians were also killed in this attack.

On 28 November 2014, Veterans Affairs Canada attributed Corporal Jacques Larocque's (8 AMS Trenton) death (27 August 2005) to the Afghanistan mission. On 21 September 2015, the city of Quinte West confirmed they were to add another name to the monument, Cpl Jacques Larocque's name was added on 16 October 2015 as the 159th Canadian soldier who died in active service on the Afghan mission.

Fatalities

Notable fatalities
On 17 May 2006, 26-year-old Captain Nichola Goddard from the 1 Royal Canadian Horse Artillery was killed during operations against insurgents. She was the first Canadian female soldier to die in combat. On 4 September the same year, Olympic athlete Private Mark Anthony Graham from the 1st Battalion The Royal Canadian Regiment was killed when two US A-10 Thunderbolt II ground attack aircraft strafed Canadian troops in a friendly fire incident. More than 30 other Canadian soldiers were wounded in the incident.

On 28 Oct 2009, Saskatoon born, 26-year-old Lieutenant Justin Boyes, assigned to the Kandahar Provincial Reconstruction Team, from 3rd Battalion, Princess Patricia's Canadian Light Infantry (3PPCLI) was killed in an explosion while leading a foot patrol 20 km southwest of Kandahar City in Panjwayi district.

Non-fatal casualties 
Figures released by DND in June 2013 show that the total number of Canadian soldiers injured and wounded in more than ten years of war reached 2,071 by the end of December 2012. 1,436 of these are listed as NBI (Non battle injuries) and 635 are listed as WIA (wounded in action).

Following a policy change at the beginning of 2010, the Canadian military began to withhold all injury reports, releasing only statistics after the end of a calendar year, citing security reasons.

The Department of National Defence also refuses to disclose the nature or severity of injuries and wounds, as it is an operational secret.

Honors and awards 
The Sacrifice Medal may be awarded to members of the Canadian Forces that they were deployed as part of a military mission, that have, on or after 7 October 2001, died or been wounded under honourable circumstances as a direct result of hostile action on the condition that the wounds that were sustained required treatment by a physician and the treatment has been documented. Most of the casualties on this page would have received the Sacrifice Medal along with the General Campaign Star for their deployment in support of the combat Operation Athena.

See also

 Canada's role in the War in Afghanistan
 Coalition casualties in Afghanistan
 Criticism of the War on Terror
 Opposition to the War in Afghanistan (2001–present)
 International public opinion on the war in Afghanistan
 Protests against the War in Afghanistan (2001–present)

References

External links
Ottawa Citizen searchable database of Canadian casualties in Afghanistan
CBC News Indepth: Afghanistan, Canadian casualties
DND site for Afghanistan casualties
The Canadian Virtual War Memorial (allows search for information about the dead by name)
CTV.ca News article listing casualties
icasualties.org list of Canadian casualties in Afghanistan
CASR: Hard Numbers  – CF Afghanistan Casualties by Vehicle Type, listed Chronologically (up to 18 Feb 2008)
 Cpl Jacques Larocque name officially announced as number 159 to Afghan Memorial

Canadian military personnel
 
Military of Canada
War in Afghanistan (2001–2021) casualties
War in Afghanistan (2001–2021)